"Thank You for Calling" is a popular and country song.

It was written by Cindy Walker. The song was published in 1954.

The song was recorded by Billy Walker, Jo Stafford, Hank Snow, and Timi Yuro.

Stafford's version was the most popular. It was recorded on April 29, 1954. The recording was released by Columbia Records as catalog number 40250. The record first reached the Billboard magazine charts on June 9, 1954 and lasted 8 weeks on the chart, peaking at #19.

References 

1954 songs
Billy Walker (musician) songs
1954 singles
Columbia Records singles
Jo Stafford songs
Songs about telephone calls
Songs written by Cindy Walker